Willem Jacob "Molly" Geertsema II (18 October 1918 – 27 June 1991) was a Dutch politician of the People's Party for Freedom and Democracy (VVD) and jurist.

Geertsema attended a Gymnasium in The Hague from June 1930 until June 1937 and applied at the Leiden University in June 1937 majoring in Law and obtaining a Bachelor of Laws degree in June 1939. On 10 May 1940 Nazi Germany invaded the Netherlands and the government fled to London to escape the German occupation. During the German occupation Geertsema continued his study but in November 1940 the German occupation authority closed the Leiden University. Geertsema worked as a civil servant for the municipality of Oegstgeest from December 1940 until December 1944. Following the end of World War II Geertsema returned to the Leiden University graduating with a Master of Laws degree in July 1947. Geertsema worked as legal educator in Leiden from August 1947 until December 1952. Geertsema served on the Municipal Council of Leiden from April 1950 until January 1953. In December 1952 Geertsema was nominated as Mayor of Warffum, taking office on 1 January 1953. In December 1956 Geertsema was appointment as Director-General of the department for Public Sector Organisations of the Ministry of the Interior, he resigned as Mayor the same day he was installed as Director-General on 1 January 1957.

Geertsema was elected as a Member of the House of Representatives after the election of 1959, taking office on 20 March 1959 serving as a frontbencher chairing the parliamentary committee for the Interior and the special parliamentary committee for Water Management in War Time and spokesperson for the Interior, Justice, Social Work, Provincial Government Affairs, Media, Kingdom Relations and deputy spokesperson for Civil Service and Local Government Affairs. In January 1961 Geertsema was nominated as Mayor of Wassenaar and dual served in those positions, taking office on 1 February 1961. After the election of 1963 the Leader of the People's Party for Freedom and Democracy and Parliamentary leader of the People's Party for Freedom and Democracy in the House of Representatives Edzo Toxopeus opted to remain Minister of the Interior in the Cabinet Marijnen, the People's Party for Freedom and Democracy leadership approached Geertsema as his successor as Parliamentary leader, Geertsema accepted and became the Parliamentary leader in the House of Representatives, taking office on 24 July 1963. The Cabinet Marijnen fell on 27 February 1965 after a disagreement in the coalition about reforms to the public broadcasting system and continued to serve in a demissionary capacity until the cabinet formation of 1965 when it was replaced by the Cabinet Cals on 14 April 1965. Toxopeus subsequently returned as a Member of the House of Representatives on 21 September 1965 but approached Geertsema to continue as Parliamentary leader. Toxopeus returned as Parliamentary leader on 12 March 1966 and Geertsema continued to serve in the House of Representatives as frontbencher again chairing the parliamentary committee for the Interior and spokesperson for the Interior, Justice, Provincial Government Affairs, Media, Kingdom Relations and deputy spokesperson for Social Work and Local Government Affairs. In September 1969 Toxopeus unexpectedly announced he was stepping down as Leader and Parliamentary leader and endorsed Geertsema as his successor, the People's Party for Freedom and Democracy leadership subsequently approached Geertsema as his successor, Geertsema accepted and became the Leader and Parliamentary leader, taking office on 1 October 1969.

For the election of 1971 Geertsema served as Lijsttrekker (top candidate). The People's Party for Freedom and Democracy suffered a small loss, losing 1 seat and now had 16 seats in the House of Representatives. In June 1971 Geertsema unexpectedly announced he was stepping down as Leader and Parliamentary leader. The following cabinet formation of 1971 resulted in a coalition agreement between the People's Party for Freedom and Democracy, the Catholic People's Party, the Anti-Revolutionary Party (ARP), the Christian Historical Union (CHU) and the Democratic Socialists '70 (DS'70) which formed the Cabinet Biesheuvel I with Geertsema appointed as Deputy Prime Minister and Minister of the Interior, taking office on 6 July 1971. The Cabinet Biesheuvel I fell just one year later on 19 July 1972 after the Democratic Socialists '70 retracted their support following there dissatisfaction with the proposed budget memorandum to further reduce the deficit and continued to serve in a demissionary capacity until the first cabinet formation of 1972 when it was replaced by the caretaker Cabinet Biesheuvel II with Geertsema continuing as Deputy Prime Minister and Minister of the Interior, taking office on 9 August 1972. Geertsema was appointed as Minister for Suriname and Netherlands Antilles Affairs following the appointment of Pierre Lardinois as the next European Commissioner, taking office on 1 January 1973. After the election of 1981 Geertsema returned as a Member of the House of Representatives, taking office on 7 February 1973 but he was still serving in the cabinet and because of dualism customs in the constitutional convention of Dutch politics he couldn't serve a dual mandate he subsequently resigned as a Member of the House of Representatives on 5 May 1973. The Cabinet Biesheuvel II was replaced by the Cabinet Den Uyl following the second cabinet formation of 1972 on 11 May 1973. Geertsema subsequently returned as a Member of the House of Representatives, taking office on 28 May 1973 serving again as a frontbencher and spokesperson for the Interior, Local Government Affairs, Provincial Government Affairs and Kingdom Relations.

In November 1973 Geertsema was nominated as the next Queen's Commissioner of Gelderland, he resigned as Member of the House of Representatives on 9 November 1973 and was installed as Queen's Commissioner, serving from 1 December 1973 until 1 November 1983. Geertsema also became active in the private sector and public sector and occupied numerous seats as a corporate director and nonprofit director on several boards of directors and supervisory boards (Heineken N.V., DSM Company, Rotterdam Dry Dock Company, NIBC Bank, Atlantic Association, SHV Holdings and  Campina) and served on several state commissions and councils on behalf of the government (Public Pension Funds PFZW, Custodial Institutions Agency, Advisory Council for Spatial Planning, Council for Culture and KPN) and as an advocate, lobbyist and activist for LGBT rights and Social justice.

Geertsema was elected as a Member of the Senate after the Senate election of 1983, taking office on 13 September 1983 serving as a frontbencher chairing the parliamentary committee for the Interior and the parliamentary committee for Kingdom Relations and spokesperson for the Interior, Local Government Affairs, Provincial Government Affairs, Civil Service and Kingdom Relations. In January 1987 Geertsema announced his retirement from national politics and that he wouldn't stand for the Senate election of 1987 and continued to serve until the end of the parliamentary term on 23 June 1987. Geertsema retired after spending 28 years in national politics but remained active in the private sector and public sector and continued to occupy numerous seats as a corporate director and nonprofit director on several boards of directors and supervisory boards.  Geertsema was also a prolific author, having written more than a dozen books and articles since 1972 about Politics and LGBT rights.

Geertsema was known for his abilities as a manager and policy wonk. Geertsema continued to comment on political affairs until his death at the age of 72.

Decorations

References

External links

Official
  Mr. W.J. (Molly) Geertsema Parlement & Politiek
  Mr. W.J. Geertsema (VVD) Eerste Kamer der Staten-Generaal

 

1918 births
1991 deaths
Commandeurs of the Légion d'honneur
Commanders of the Order of the Netherlands Lion
Deputy Prime Ministers of the Netherlands
Dutch agnostics
Dutch corporate directors
Dutch legal educators
Dutch lobbyists
Dutch nonprofit directors
Dutch nonprofit executives
Dutch people of World War II
Dutch political writers
Dutch social justice activists
Grand Officers of the Order of Leopold II
Grand Officers of the Order of Orange-Nassau
King's and Queen's Commissioners of Gelderland
Leaders of the People's Party for Freedom and Democracy
Leiden University alumni
Dutch LGBT rights activists
Mayors in Groningen (province)
Mayors in South Holland
Members of the House of Representatives (Netherlands)
Members of the Senate (Netherlands)
Ministers of Kingdom Relations of the Netherlands
Ministers of the Interior of the Netherlands
Municipal councillors of Leiden
Municipal councillors of The Hague
People's Party for Freedom and Democracy politicians
People from Eemsmond
People from Leiden
People from Rheden
Politicians from Utrecht (city)
People from Wassenaar
20th-century Dutch businesspeople
20th-century Dutch civil servants
20th-century Dutch educators
20th-century Dutch jurists
20th-century Dutch male writers
20th-century Dutch politicians